Khiladi 420 (English: Player 420) is a 2000 Indian Bollywood action thriller film directed by Neeraj Vora and starring Akshay Kumar and Mahima Chaudhry. The film was written by Uttam Gada and released on 29 December 2000. It is the seventh installment in the Khiladi series starring Kumar, which included Khiladi (1992), Main Khiladi Tu Anari (1994), Sabse Bada Khiladi (1995), Khiladiyon Ka Khiladi (1996), Mr. and Mrs. Khiladi (1997) and International Khiladi (1999). 

This film marked the third time Akshay Kumar played a dual role after Jai Kishen (1994) and Aflatoon (1997). After Aflatoon, this was the second time Kumar played both a positive and negative role. 

The film is notable for featuring some of Akshay Kumar's most dangerous stunts, including a scene where he catches and climbs a running plane, stands on top of it, and then jumps onto a hot air balloon while 1,000 feet up in the air; the stunt drew comparisons to Jackie Chan. However, the film was a box office failure, and was the last Khiladi film up until Khiladi 786 (2012) twelve years later.

Plot 
Shyam Prasad Bhardwaj (Alok Nath) is a multi-millionaire industrialist, and his business is spread worldwide. He has a daughter, Ritu (Mahima Chaudhry), who is of marriageable age. He hires Dev Kumar (Akshay Kumar) to work for him, and is impressed with the way Dev handles himself. Shyam would like Ritu and Dev to get married. But days after the engagement, Shyam finds that Dev is a con man after his money, since he has taken debt from a criminal (Gulshan Grover).

Dev kills Shyam to bury the secret, but Ritu's niece Riya sees this. The girl goes in a deep shock & since Dev is constantly watching her, the secret cannot come out. Dev plans to kill her as well, but Ritu gets an inkling of the truth somehow. Dev tries to kill Ritu on the night of their honeymoon, but Ritu manages to kill him.

A scared Ritu goes to her grandmother, who informs her Dev is hurt but alive in hospital. She visits the hospital and gets the shock of her life to see Dev alive – and without a scratch on his body. Dev behaves as if nothing happened. Everyone in the home believes him to be Dev. Finally, when they are left alone, Anand reveals his true identity to Ritu. He calms her down & tells her that he is indeed Dev's identical twin brother Anand (Akshay Kumar again).

Anand explains that Dev had crooked ways, something which Anand disliked. The brothers separated. Dev met Anand just a week ago to tell him that he has mended his ways & is going to get married. Dev came there to meet Ritu. Dev had given all the information about Ritu & her family to Anand. That night, Anand came to meet Dev just after Ritu had killed him. Anand saw all the mess & realized that something had gone wrong.

But when he saw his ID, he realized that Dev was posing as Anand here. Now Dev was probably dead, for which he is grateful to Ritu as Dev might have had a plan to kill him along with her. Ritu & Anand kept this a secret. However, Inspector Rahul (Sudhanshu Pandey), an old friend of Ritu, became suspicious. Besides, Dev's girlfriend, whom Anand does not recognize, thinks that Dev has dumped her. Dev's another enemy is a criminal named Bhai (Mukesh Rishi), who is also a rival of his money lender.

Ritu slowly starts falling for Anand, but Anand doesn't reciprocate the feelings. Anand has to live a double life – in front of the bad guys, and he is Anand, while in front of Ritu's family, he is Dev. Rahul becomes suspicious that Ritu & Dev conspired to kill Shyam. To save Ritu, Anand takes the blame on his shoulders.

Meanwhile, when both the criminals try to get even with Dev, Rahul realizes that he has not seen a clear picture. Anand tells him the true story, which he reluctantly believes. As he cannot see an innocent man die, Rahul proposes that Anand can live only if Dev's dead body is found.

Anand escapes from custody as per Rahul's plans & retrieves his brother's body from the place where Dev's girlfriend hid it. He wants the people to believe that the bad twin died in an accident after the escape while he is the good person. Dev's rivals unite & try to kill Anand. Anand succeeds in killing the villain. When Dev's body is found, the court closes the case. Anand is exonerated & reunited with Ritu.

Cast 
Akshay Kumar as Dev Kumar Malhotra / Anand Kumar Malhotra (twin brothers) (dual role)
Mahima Chaudhry as Ritu Malhotra (nee Bhardwaj)
Antara Mali as Monica D'Souza
Gulshan Grover as Bhai (gangster)
Alok Nath as Shyam Prasad Bhardwaj
Sudhanshu Pandey as Inspector Rahul
Mukesh Rishi as Bhai (gangster)
Shayaji Shinde as Bhai (gangster)
Dilip Joshi as Arora
Razak Khan as Gawas
Viju Khote as Nadkarni

Soundtracks 
The music of Khiladi 420 is composed by Sanjeev-Darshan and Sameer penned the lyrics.

Stunts 
Akshay Kumar performed some of his most dangerous stunts during a scene in the film. During one scene, in Kumar's own words: "I had to catch this running plane and climb it. People are scared of sitting inside a plane, and like a stupid man I am standing on top of a plane. And then I’m supposed to jump from that plane, after it is a thousand feet up in the air, onto a hot air balloon. I did it in one shot."

Towards the end of the film, which involves car chases and fight scenes, Kumar performs various other stunts. During the finale, he is seen being chased by a car, dodging bullets, jumping off buildings, and climbing walls.

Reception

Box office 
At the box office, the film grossed , equivalent to  adjusted for inflation . The film was a flop at the box office.

Critical response 
His character in the film had two names, and his role received mixed reviews at the time. In his review, Taran Adarsh wrote that "The actor does a great job in a role that has negative shades, but as a softie in the second half, he is just about okay. And that's mainly because he has been asked to do what he has been doing in film after film. Nevertheless, Khiladi 420 is amongst his finest performances." Sukanya Verma wrote "Negative roles and Akshay Kumar don't go hand-in-hand. [...] Akshay is ridiculously over the top and irritating to the core. However, he manages a decent performance as the sober and suave Anand."

Retrospectively, the film has received acclaim for its action scenes and stunt sequences. The hot air balloon stunt, in particular, is considered Kumar's most dangerous stunt, and has been compared to Jackie Chan, who had also performed a stunt involving a hot air balloon in Armour of God (1986).

Return to the series 
Akshay Kumar came back to the Khiladi series with Khiladi 786, which was released on 7 December 2012, 12 years after his last appearance in the Khiladi series.

Home Media
The DVD of the movie was released by Eros Home Video. The television premiere of the movie was occurred on Star Plusin 2001. The film has been made streaming available on Zee5 since 2021

References

External links 
 

2000 action thriller films
2000s Hindi-language films
2000 films
Films set in Canada
Twins in Indian films
Films scored by Sanjoy Chowdhury
Films shot in Toronto
Indian action thriller films
Films directed by Neeraj Vora